Meyers is a surname of English origin; many branches of the Meyers family trace their origins to Anglo-Saxon England. The name is derived from the Old French name Maire, meaning "mayor", or an officer in charge of legal matters. The name may also be an Anglicization of the Irish surname ó Meidhir or one of the Scottish surname MacMoyers

Notable people
Adam Meyers (1812–1875), lawyer and political figure in Canada West
Al Meyers (1908–1976), American pioneer aviator
Albert Meyers (1932–2007), American organic chemist, professor at Colorado State University
Albertus L. Meyers (1890–1979), American music conductor and cornet player
Ann Meyers (born 1955), former American basketball player and current sportscaster
Anne Akiko Meyers (born 1970), American concert violinist
Ari Meyers (born 1969), American actress, best known from the television series Kate & Allie
August Meyers (1864–1951), American politician
Augustus Meyers (1841–1919), American Civil War soldier and author of Ten Years in the Ranks, U.S. Army
Benjamin Franklin Meyers (1833–1918), politician
Beth Meyers (born 1959), American politician
Bethany C. Meyers, American fitness instructor
Brad Meyers (born 1980), Australian National Rugby League player
Bruce F. Meyers, American car designer and entrepreneur, best known for the Meyers Manx dune buggy
Carol Meyers (born 1942), feminist biblical scholar
Carole Meyers (died 2007), rabbi
Carolyn Meyers, former president of Jackson State University
Chad Meyers (born 1975), former infielder and outfielder in Major League Baseball
Charlie Meyers, American politician and army man
Chief Meyers (1880–1971), Major League Baseball catcher from 1909 to 1917
Dave Meyers (basketball) (1953–2015), American basketball player
Dave Meyers (director) (born 1980), American music video director
Diana Tietjens Meyers, philosopher
Elvet Meyers (born 1960), sailor
Errol Solomon Meyers (1890–1956), Brisbane doctor
Françoise Bettencourt Meyers (born 1953), French heiress and author
Franklin Meyers (born 1967), Dutch politician
Franz Meyers (1908–2002), German politician
Freddie Meyers (born 1930s), former Canadian footballer
G. Bruce Meyers (born 1948), American politician
George Meyers (1865–1943), Major League Baseball third baseman
Gerald C. Meyers (born 1928), American industrialist, former Chairman of American Motors Corporation
Glenford J. Myers, computer scientist, an author of a number of books.
Hazel Meyers, American singer
J. E. Meyers (1862–1944), insurance salesman, philanthropist, and politician
Jack Meyers, American music promoter
Jake Meyers (born 1996), American baseball player
Jakobi Meyers (born 1996), American football player
Jan Meyers (1928–2019), American politician
Jeffrey Meyers (born 1939), American biographer, literary, art and film critic
Jerry Meyers (born 1965), American college baseball coach
Jill Meyers (born 1950), American bridge player
Joel Meyers, American sportscaster, current play-by-play announcer for the Los Angeles Lakers
John Meyers (disambiguation), several
Johnny Weaver, professional wrestler and wrestling commentator
Jonathan Rhys Meyers (born 1977), Irish actor
Josh Meyers (disambiguation), multiple people
Julie Meyers (born 2000), Belgian artistic gymnast
Klinks Meyers (1890–1933), professional American football player
Krystal Meyers (born 1988), American Christian rock musician
Lanny Meyers (born 1956), American composer, orchestrator, principal arranger, and musical director
Leroy F. Meyers (1927–1995), mathematician
Linda Meyers (born 1937), retired American alpine skier
Linn Meyers (born 1968), American, Washington, D.C.–based artist
Lou Meyers (1859–1920), 19th-century baseball catcher and outfielder
Louis Meyers (1950s–2016), American festival organizer
Marc A. Meyers (born 1946), American materials scientist, engineer, and professor
Marc Meyers, American feature film director and screenwriter
Marilyn Meyers (born 1942), Chargé d'Affaires ad interim to Burma from September 1994 – October 1996
Mary Meyers (born 1946), American speed skater
Maury Meyers (1932–2014)
Michael Myers (disambiguation), several people
Nancy Meyers (born 1949), American film director, producer, and screenwriter
Nina Palmquist Meyers, wife of Earl Warren
Richard Meyers (born 1949), better known as Richard Hell, American punk-rock singer, songwriter, and bass guitarist
Roger Meyers, Sr., fictional founder of Itchy and Scratchy Studios
Scott Meyers (born 1959), American author of several books on object-oriented programming
Seth Meyers (born 1973), American actor and comedian, host of late-night talk show, Late Night with Seth Meyers
Sidney Meyers (1906–1969), American film director and editor
Sydney Herbert Meyers, of Eedle and Meyers
 William "Billy" Meyers, "policy dealer" (numbers racketeer) investigated by the Lexow Committee
William M. Colmer (middle name, Meyers, 1890–1980), Mississippi politician

See also

 Meyers Konversations-Lexikon, a major German encyclopedia that existed from 1839 until 1984
 Miss Meyers (1949–1963), an American racehorse
 Lori Meyers, a Spanish indie rock pop group
 Løgismose Meyers, a food company based in Copenhagen, Denmark
 David Meyers (disambiguation)
 Eric Meyers (disambiguation)
 Josh Meyers (disambiguation)
 Meyers House (disambiguation)
 Related surnames: Myers, Meijers, Meyer, De Meyer, Von Meyer, Meier, Meijer, Myer, Meyr, Mayer, Mayr, Maier, Meir, Mair, Meyerson, Myerson

References

Jewish surnames
Yiddish-language surnames
Surnames of English origin